{{Infobox television
| image = 
| image_upright = 
| image_size = 
| image_alt = 
| caption = 
| alt_name = 
| genre =  
| creator = 
| based_on = 
| developer = 
| writer = Dilawar Khan
| screenplay = 
| story = 
| director = Shafqat Moin-ud-Din
| creative_director = 
| presenter = 
| starring =  
| judges = 
| voices = SingersSahir Ali BaggaBeena Khan
| narrated = 
| theme_music_composer = 
| opentheme = 
| endtheme = 
| composer = Sahir Ali Bagga
| country = Pakistan
| language = Urdu
| num_seasons =  1
| num_episodes = 97
| list_episodes = 
| executive_producer = 
| producer = Eveready Pictures
| editor = Syed Arsalan Ali and Irfan Qasim
| location = 
| cinematography = Azhar Abbas
| camera = Multi-camera setup
| runtime = 15 – 20 minutes
| company = 
| budget = 
| network = Hum TV
| picture_format = 
| audio_format = Stereophonic sound
| released = 
| first_aired = 
| last_aired = 
| related = 
}}Bad Gumaan (lit: Mistrust'''''), is a Pakistani romantic television drama serial and soap that aired on 19 September 2016, on Hum TV. It is produced by Momina Duraid under MD Productions It stars Shamil Khan, Imran Ashraf, Omer Farooq, and Javeria Abbasi.

Plot
The story revolves around a family man named Salman, who is happily living with his wife Sania, and their two daughters. Salman’s sister was living in the same house, whose one daughter is married to Sania’s brother. Salman’s life changes when a graceful lady enters her office. Sabahat is a mature woman, who didn’t marry because of her younger brother’s responsibility. Now, she is looking to marry Raheel, her younger brother, into some decent family. After a little development, Raheel’s proposal is accepted for Salman’s niece. During the marriage, Salman and Sabahat get to know each other quite well and this develops into an intimate relationship. Although Salman is married and well-settled with his family, he cannot stay away from Sabahat’s persona. This creates a strange dilemma.

Cast 
 Shamil Khan as Salman
 Omer Farooq as Raheel
 Mahjabeen Habib as Sania
 Zahra Shah as Abeera
 Imran Ashraf as Jawad
 Amar Khan as Saman 
 Javeria Abbasi as Sabahat
 Abid Ali as Nawaz
 Humaira Bano as Sania's mother
 Farhan Ali Agha
 Erum Azam as Zoya 
 Hashim Butt as Jibran
 Birjees Farooqui as Jibran's wife
 Nargis Rasheed as Shaista

See also 
 List of programs broadcast by Hum TV
 2016 in Pakistani television

References

External links 
 Official Website

Hum TV
Hum Network Limited
Hum TV original programming
Pakistani romantic drama television series
Pakistani television soap operas
Serial drama television series
MD Productions
Television series by MD Productions
Television series created by Momina Duraid
Urdu-language television shows
2016 Pakistani television series debuts